The 2015 Monza GP3 Series round was a GP3 Series motor race held on September 5 and 6, 2015 at Autodromo Nazionale Monza, Italy. It was the sixth round of the 2015 GP3 Series. The race supported the 2015 Italian Grand Prix.

Classification

Qualifying

Feature race

Sprint race

See also 
 2015 Italian Grand Prix
 2015 Monza GP2 Series round

References

Monza
Monza GP3